David Bell (17 April 1828 – 23 November 1894) was an Australian politician.

He was born at Maitland to overseer Robert Bell. Little is known of him, but he was an unmarried pastoralist who probably held runs at Geogola and Spring Flat. In 1861 he was elected to the New South Wales Legislative Assembly for Camden, but he did not re-contest in 1864. Bell died in Dubbo in 1894.

References

 

1828 births
1894 deaths
Members of the New South Wales Legislative Assembly
19th-century Australian politicians